The 2009 Northwestern Wildcats football team represented Northwestern University in the Big Ten during the 2009 NCAA Division I FBS football season. Pat Fitzgerald, in his fourth season at Northwestern, was the team's head coach. The Wildcats home games were played at Ryan Field in Evanston, Illinois. The Wildcats finished the season 8–5, 5–3 in Big Ten play and lost in the Outback Bowl 35–38 in overtime against Auburn.

Schedule

Regular season

Towson

It was apparent that Towson didn't stand a chance from the get-go. Northwestern raced out to a 30–0 lead before putting in the reserves out of mercy. To Towson's credit, they did go toe-to-toe with Northwestern's second and third stringers, which is no small feat, given that Northwestern is a somewhat prestigious FBS school and Towson is a mostly unheralded FCS school. The game allowed both teams to get some experience for the future and the final 35 minutes gave Northwestern's younger players some good game experience. This would prove to be one of Northwestern's few blowout wins of the 2009 season.

Eastern Michigan

Northwestern seemed poised to cruise to another dominating blowout victory when they raced out to a 21–3 halftime lead and still held a fairly comfortable 21–10 lead after three quarters and widened the lead to 24–10 early in the 4th. Northwestern eventually found themselves only ahead 24–17 and soon the game was tied at 24–24. To avoid the game going into overtime, the Wildcats finished off the stubborn Eagles with a field goal.

Syracuse

Fresh off of a closer than expected win over Eastern Michigan, Northwestern went to the Carrier Dome to face a Syracuse team that had played Minnesota down to the wire in week one before being obliterated by a Penn State team that didn't allow a single Orange point until the reserves were all subbed in. This game would go Syracuse's way, however as the up and down Orange, who would later secure a win over a talented Rutgers team (but in blowout fashion 31–13), engaged in a shootout with Northwestern, finally kicking the all important field goal to win the game as time expired. This put Syracuse at 1–2 and Northwestern at 2–1.

Minnesota

Going toe-to-toe with a Gophers team that had beaten the same Syracuse team that the Wildcats had lost to, Northwestern plays a close game with Minnesota, even leading 24–21 going into the final quarter before Minnesota takes momentum back to win the game 35–24, putting the Wildcats at 2–2. But still, no blowout losses.

Purdue

The Boilermakers race out to a 14–3 first quarter lead and still hold a 21–16 halftime lead, but the Wildcats steal one from the stubborn and better than their record Boilermakers (who would later on upset the Buckeyes) with a second half rally. Still trailing 21–19 after three, the final Northwestern touchdown puts them ahead 27–21 for the win.

Miami (OH)

Unlike the game with Eastern Michigan, this one wouldn't come down to theatrics, Northwestern led 10–0 after one and scored six more in the third quarter to take a commanding 16–0 lead. Poised for the shutout, Miami got on the board late in the fourth quarter, but Northwestern denied them the two-point conversion to make it a game.

Michigan State

Facing another better than their record Big Ten team, this time Northwestern wouldn't get so lucky. Leading 7–0 at halftime, they soon trailed 17–7 after three, and despite giving Michigan State all they could handle, the game was destined to go Sparty's way.

Indiana

If there is any team better than their record in 2009, it's Indiana. Despite blowout losses to Iowa (42–24) and Ohio State (33–14) which are understandable, the Hoosiers had one ugly blemish on their schedule, a 47–7 loss to a Virginia team that had no business keeping it competitive with Indiana, let alone winning like that. Indiana also suffered a 31–20 loss to Penn State that wasn't as close as the score. However, Indiana played like they were the heavy favorite going into this game taking a commanding 21–0 first quarter lead and still rolled it up to 28–7 early in the second before Northwestern cut it close to 28–17. Trailing 28–19 after a quiet third quarter that saw only a safety, the Wildcats would not be denied. Northwestern turned the game into a win by scoring ten fourth quarter points.

Penn State

Handing Northwestern their only blowout loss of 2009, Penn State was shut down by Northwestern's offense for the first 40 minutes of the game until they finally got some momentum late in the third quarter, scoring three rapid fourth-quarter touchdowns to give the game an appearance of being a much easier win for Penn State than it really was. Northwestern quarterback Mike Kafka was injured late in the game, which led to backup Dan Persa being thrust under the lights.  After the injury, NU's offense could do little against the vaunted Penn State defense. Regardless, this was Northwestern's only humiliating loss of what was a mostly positive 2009 season.

Iowa

Licking their wounds from the massacre at the hands of Penn State, the Wildcats traveled to Kinnick Stadium to take on the undefeated Hawkeyes, ranked #4 in the BCS, fresh off of a 42–24 blowout win over Indiana, who actually led 21–7 early on over Iowa and still led 24–14 deep in the game before Iowa took command in the second half. It looked early on like Iowa was poised to make mincemeat out of Northwestern as Penn State had done a week before. This game wouldn't go Iowa's way, however; the Hawkeyes would lose their star quarterback Ricky Stanzi in the second quarter and would never recover. Northwestern nabs their best win of 2009 by upsetting then #6 Iowa (who would finish #7 in the nation) 17–10 on the road.

Illinois

Illinois was bowl ineligible and had little to play for except pride, which they played with in this game and had shown increasing amounts of since their 38–13 upset of Michigan. Northwestern controlled the game for three quarters before Illinois suddenly sprang to life, but the Wildcats hung on to beat the pesky Illini 21–16, and win the inaugural Land of Lincoln Trophy, which replaced the Sweet Sioux Tomahawk.

Wisconsin

Northwestern managed to grab their second major upset of 2009 against the Badgers under the lights at Ryan Field. It looked like Wisconsin was going to get blown out as the Wildcats raced out to a 27–14 halftime lead, but Wisconsin fought back to make it 30–24 after three, but Northwestern recovered a fumble on Wisky's final drive to hang on to their second big upset of 2009, winning 33–31.

Outback Bowl

Auburn

In what is remembered as one of the most entertaining bowl games of all time, Mike Kafka set bowl game records with 78 passing attempts and 47 completions.  After a back and forth affair with numerous turnovers and missed field goals, overtime seemed only fitting.  With kicker Stefan Demos hurt, Northwestern tried a fake field goal which failed, giving Auburn, the next year's national champions, the victory.

Roster

References

Northwestern
Northwestern Wildcats football seasons
Northwestern Wildcats football